In Greek mythology, Hecaterus or Hekateros (Ancient Greek: Ἑκάτερος) was a minor god and the father of five daughters (the Hecaterides) by the daughter of Phoroneus, and through them grandfather of the Oreads, Satyrs, and Curetes.

His name has been interpreted as referring to the hekateris (a rustic dance which involves quickly moving hands), and himself as a patron or personification of this dance. On the other hand, it has been suggested that the name "Hekateros" (which stands in the genitive case Ἑκατέρου in the original Greek text) could result from corruption of the purported ἑκ Δώρου "of Dorus".

Notes

References 

 Gantz, Timothy, Early Greek Myth: A Guide to Literary and Artistic Sources, Johns Hopkins University Press, 1996, Two volumes:  (Vol. 1),  (Vol. 2).
 Strabo, The Geography of Strabo. Edition by H.L. Jones. Cambridge, Mass.: Harvard University Press; London: William Heinemann, Ltd. 1924. Online version at the Perseus Digital Library.
 Strabo, Geographica edited by A. Meineke. Leipzig: Teubner. 1877. Greek text available at the Perseus Digital Library.

Greek gods